The Merchant Hall is a historic building on The Promenade, Clifton Down, Bristol, England.

It was built in 1868 by Richard Shackleton Pope, Thomas Pope and John Bindon and converted after World War II for the Society of Merchant Venturers, whose original hall in central Bristol was destroyed during the Bristol Blitz.

It has been designated by English Heritage as a grade II listed building.

References 

Culture in Bristol
Grade II listed buildings in Bristol
Buildings and structures completed in 1868
Country houses in Bristol